Gisèle Gautier (born 9 December 1938) is a French politician and a member of the Senate of France. She represents the Loire-Atlantique department and is a member of the Union for a Popular Movement Party.

References
Page on the Senate website

1938 births
Living people
French Senators of the Fifth Republic
Women members of the Senate (France)
People from Loire-Atlantique
Union for a Popular Movement politicians
21st-century French women politicians
20th-century French women politicians
Senators of Loire-Atlantique